The parable of the broken window was introduced by French economist Frédéric Bastiat in his 1850 essay "That Which We See and That Which We Do Not See" ("") to illustrate why destruction, and the money spent to recover from destruction, is not actually a net benefit to society.

The parable seeks to show how opportunity costs, as well as the law of unintended consequences, affect economic activity in ways that are unseen or ignored. The belief that destruction is good for the economy is consequently known as the broken window fallacy or glazier's fallacy.

Parable
Bastiat's original parable of the broken window from "Ce qu'on voit et ce qu'on ne voit pas" (1850):

Interpretations and evidence

Bastiat's argument
Suppose it was discovered that the little boy was actually hired by the glazier, and paid a franc for every window he broke. Suddenly the same act would be regarded as theft: the glazier was breaking windows to force people to hire his services. Yet the facts observed by the onlookers remain true: the glazier benefits from the business at the expense of the baker, the tailor, and so on.

Bastiat argues that society endorses activities that are morally equivalent to the glazier hiring a boy to break windows for him:

Bastiat is not addressing production – he is addressing the stock of wealth. In other words, Bastiat does not merely look at the immediate but at the longer effects of breaking the window. Bastiat takes into account the consequences of breaking the window for society as a whole, rather than for just one group.

Austrian theorists cite this fallacy, saying it is a common element of popular thinking. The 20th century American economist Henry Hazlitt devoted a chapter to the fallacy in his book Economics in One Lesson.

Cost of disasters
The broken-window scenario is used as an analogy for destruction by natural disasters. Disasters disrupt economic activity. The economic effects of natural disasters are varied.

Countries are more likely to have GDP fall after a disaster if they have more unemployment, more poverty, less effective local and national governments and institutions, and weaker economic and diplomatic connections. Countries are more likely to have a GDP boost and recover quickly from a disaster if they retain a skilled workforce and the ability to mobilize resources for reconstruction, including resources from outside the disaster area. On the one hand, prompt recovery has been attributed to prompt insurance and aid payments, with the contrast between Hurricane Andrew and Hurricane Katrina as an anecdotal example.  On the other hand, slow recovery has been blamed on predatory behaviour, with those unharmed or less-harmed by the disaster taking advantage of those more harmed.

Areas that have had repeated disasters tend to invest more in skills and education (possibly because this is preferred to riskier investment in infrastructure, which might be destroyed again), and they tend to have a higher total factor productivity (possibly also because infrastructure destroyed in disasters is replaced with better infrastructure, as, for instance, in the Great Fire of London). These tendencies could in theory lead to longer-term economic benefits (which may cause GDP growth).

There is some evidence that geological disasters do more economic harm than climate-related disasters, in the long term. Geological disasters, such as landslides and earthquakes, happen with little immediate warning and kill many people. Climate-related disasters, such as hurricanes, are more predictable on a scale of days to hours, and kill fewer people. Such warning saves people, but not immovable property. This suggests that killing people does long-lasting economic harm, while destroying capital is not as harmful to GDP growth.

"Destroy any amount of physical capital, but leave behind a critical number of knowledgeable human beings whose brains still house the culture and technology of a dynamic economy, and the physical capital will tend to reemerge almost spontaneously" — George Horwich, Purdue University

Even in disasters with few physical injuries, a large portion of the economic cost may be public health effects (approximately a tenth, in the case of the summer 2007 floods in the UK). The economic costs of disruption to children's education are significant. Mental health issues may be triggered or exacerbated by the distress suffered during the disaster. Health advice on minimizing psychosocial stress has been given for disasters. While public health costs may contribute to economic activity and GDP growth, growth in demand for medical or educational assistance is unlikely to be seen as beneficial.

Opportunity cost of war

Occasionally the argument has been made that war is a benefactor to society and that "war is good for the economy." A variant of this argument suggests that, while war cannot be fairly called a benefactor, it can and sometimes does confer some economic benefits. However, this belief is often given as an example of the broken window fallacy. The money spent on the war effort (or peacetime defense spending), for example, is money that cannot be spent on food, clothing, health care, or other sectors of the economy. The stimulus felt in one sector of the economy comes at a direct – but hidden – cost (via foreclosed production possibilities) to other sectors.

Bastiat himself argued against the claim that hiring men to be soldiers was inherently beneficial to the economy in the second chapter of That Which is Seen, and That Which is Not Seen, "The Disbanding of Troops".

According to Hazlitt:

See also

 Cobra effect
 Creative destruction
 Disaster capitalism
 Dutch disease  (economics)
 Jevons paradox
 Opportunity cost
 Rent-seeking
 Spending multiplier
 Tax choice
 Uneconomic growth
 Zero-sum game
 Zero-sum thinking

References

Bibliography
 
  (PDF)

Further reading

External links

 "Ce qu'on voit et ce qu'on ne voit pas" (original essay)
 "That Which is Seen and That Which is Not Seen" (English translation)

Classical liberalism
History of economic thought
Libertarian theory
Parables
Windows
Informal fallacies